Parodi's hemispingus (Kleinothraupis parodii) is a species of bird in the family Thraupidae, endemic to Peru.

Its natural habitat is subtropical or tropical moist montane forests.

References

Parodi's hemispingus
Endemic birds of Peru
Birds of the Peruvian Andes
Parodi's hemispingus
Parodi's hemispingus
Parodi's hemispingus
Taxonomy articles created by Polbot